The Stade Alphonse Massemba-Débat (formally named Stade de la Revolution) in Brazzaville is one of the two national stadiums of the Congo national football team, along with the Stade Municipal de Kintélé. It is used for football matches and also has an athletics track and a handball court. It hosts the home games of CARA Brazzaville and Étoile du Congo. It holds 33,037 people. It was the venue for the 1965 All-Africa Games and the 2004 African Championships in Athletics.

References  

Photos at cafe.daum.net/stade
Photos at worldstadiums.com
Photos at fussballtempel.net

Football venues in the Republic of the Congo
Athletics (track and field) venues in the Republic of the Congo
Sports venues in the Republic of the Congo
Congo, Republic of
Stadiums of the African Games
Buildings and structures in Brazzaville
CARA Brazzaville
Sport in Brazzaville